Yana Sergeyevna Noskova (born 2 February 1994) is a Russian table tennis player. She competed for Russia at the 2012 Summer Olympics.

References

Russian female table tennis players
Table tennis players at the 2012 Summer Olympics
Olympic table tennis players of Russia
1994 births
Living people
Table tennis players at the 2010 Summer Youth Olympics
Table tennis players at the 2015 European Games
European Games competitors for Russia
Universiade medalists in table tennis
Universiade bronze medalists for Russia
Table tennis players at the 2019 European Games
Medalists at the 2013 Summer Universiade
Medalists at the 2015 Summer Universiade
Medalists at the 2019 Summer Universiade
Table tennis players at the 2020 Summer Olympics
20th-century Russian women
21st-century Russian women